Official historic sites of the state of Texas may be under the supervision of the Texas Parks and Wildlife Department (TPWD) or the Texas Historical Commission (THC).

Key

Sites with multiple historic designations are colored according to their highest designation within the following hierarchy.

Texas geography-related lists